Career Times, an English-language recruitment weekly for business executives, has been published by Hong Kong Economic Times Holdings every Friday since 1997. It prints quality job postings, especially in the banking and finance, engineering, information technology, merchandising and sales sectors.

Careertimes.com.hk, the online version of Career Times, was launched in 1999 as an alternative recruitment and information portal for jobseekers and human resources professionals. It offers full editorial contents synchronised with Career Times, including recruitment related information, self-improvement, industry insights and exclusive interviews.

External links
  

English-language newspapers published in Hong Kong
Newspapers established in 1997
1997 establishments in Hong Kong